Thomas Krol (born 16 August 1992) is a Dutch speed skater who is specialized in the 1000m and 1500m.

Career
Krol finished third at the ISU World Cup 1500m event in Berlin in December 2014.
Krol is a member of Team Jumbo-Visma.

Personal records

Source:

Tournament overview

Source:

World Cup overview

Source:
 – = Did not participate
 (b) = Division B
 DNF = Did not finish

Medals won

References

External links

1992 births
Living people
Dutch male speed skaters
Sportspeople from Deventer
World Sprint Speed Skating Championships medalists
World Single Distances Speed Skating Championships medalists
Speed skaters at the 2022 Winter Olympics
Medalists at the 2022 Winter Olympics
Olympic speed skaters of the Netherlands
Olympic medalists in speed skating
Olympic gold medalists for the Netherlands
Olympic silver medalists for the Netherlands
20th-century Dutch people
21st-century Dutch people